Portland Township is a township in Kossuth County, Iowa, United States.

History
Portland Township was organized in 1869.

References

Townships in Kossuth County, Iowa
Townships in Iowa
1869 establishments in Iowa
Populated places established in 1869